Lake Shore is a census-designated place (CDP) in Clark County, Washington, United States. The population was 6,571 at the 2010 census.

Based on per capita income, one of the more reliable measures of affluence, Lake Shore ranks 124th of 614 areas in the state of Washington to be ranked.

Geography
Lake Shore is located in southwestern Clark County at  (45.690638, -122.691025), on the east side of Vancouver Lake. It is bordered to the northwest by Felida, to the northeast by Salmon Creek, to the southeast by Hazel Dell, and to the south by the city of Vancouver.

Demographics
As of the census of 2000, there were 6,670 people, 2,355 households, and 1,940 families residing in the CDP. The population density was 4,110.1 people per square mile (1,589.7/km2). There were 2,415 housing units at an average density of 1,488.2/sq mi (575.6/km2). The racial makeup of the CDP was 92.38% White, 1.20% African American, 0.72% Native American, 2.46% Asian, 0.07% Pacific Islander, 0.67% from other races, and 2.49% from two or more races. Hispanic or Latino of any race were 2.91% of the population. 21.7% were of German, 11.9% English, 8.8% Irish, 6.8% Norwegian and 5.6% American ancestry according to Census 2000.

There were 2,355 households, out of which 36.4% had children under the age of 18 living with them, 70.6% were married couples living together, 8.6% had a female householder with no husband present, and 17.6% were non-families. 13.2% of all households were made up of individuals, and 5.0% had someone living alone who was 65 years of age or older. The average household size was 2.83 and the average family size was 3.09.

In the CDP, the age distribution of the population shows 27.7% under the age of 18, 6.4% from 18 to 24, 26.1% from 25 to 44, 29.4% from 45 to 64, and 10.4% who were 65 years of age or older. The median age was 39 years. For every 100 females, there were 100.3 males. For every 100 females age 18 and over, there were 96.9 males.

The median income for a household in the CDP was $62,476, and the median income for a family was $66,217. Males had a median income of $48,716 versus $35,300 for females. The per capita income for the CDP was $27,008. About 3.6% of families and 3.3% of the population were below the poverty line, including 3.9% of those under age 18 and 6.4% of those age 65 or over.

References

Census-designated places in Clark County, Washington
Census-designated places in Washington (state)
Portland metropolitan area